Uktamjon Rahmonov (born August 31, 1990 in Fergana) is an Uzbek amateur boxer who fought at the 2012 Summer Olympics at junior welterweight.  He advanced to the quarterfinals in the Olympics but lost to top favorite Cuban Roniel Iglesias

2012 Olympics
In the round of 32, Rahmonov beat Anderson Rojas 16-10.
He beat Yakup Sener 16-8 in the round of 16.  He lost in the quarterfinals to Roniel Iglesias 15-21.

See also
Boxing at the 2012 Summer Olympics – Men's light welterweight

References

Living people
Boxers at the 2012 Summer Olympics
Olympic boxers of Uzbekistan
1990 births
People from Fergana
Asian Games medalists in boxing
Boxers at the 2010 Asian Games
Uzbekistani male boxers
Asian Games silver medalists for Uzbekistan
Medalists at the 2010 Asian Games
Light-welterweight boxers
21st-century Uzbekistani people